Maxime Baca (born 2 June 1983) is a French former professional footballer who played as a defender.

Career
Baca began his career by Paris Saint-Germain, before joining L'Entente SSG in July 2003. After two years he left Saint-Gratien and moved to Le Havre AC in Summer 2005. On 2 June 2009, FC Lorient signed him from Le Havre on a free transfer until June 2011.

In June 2014, after five years in Lorient, he agreed to a two-year contract with local rivals En Avant de Guingamp.

References

External links

1983 births
Living people
People from Corbeil-Essonnes
Footballers from Essonne
Association football defenders
French footballers
Entente SSG players
Le Havre AC players
FC Lorient players
En Avant Guingamp players
Ligue 1 players
Ligue 2 players